Codatractus arizonensis, the Arizona skipper, is a species of dicot skipper in the family of butterflies known as Hesperiidae. It is found in Central America and North America.

References

Further reading

 

Eudaminae
Articles created by Qbugbot